The Boundary Fire is a wildfire in Glacier National Park in the U.S. state of Montana. First reported in the evening of August 23, 2018, the fire is located slightly more than a mile west of Waterton Lake in the Boundary Creek Valley near Campbell Mountain. The fire straddles the international border but did not cross into Waterton Lakes National Park in Alberta, Canada. Firefighters were deployed to the Goat Haunt region to install sprinklers and be prepared for structure protection. By September 9 the fire was reported as being  and only 12 percent contained.

References 

2018 in Montana
Glacier National Park (U.S.)
2018 Montana wildfires